The Verified Voting Foundation is a non-governmental, nonpartisan organization founded in 2004 by David L. Dill, a computer scientist from Stanford University, focused on how technology impacts the administration of US elections. The organization’s mission is to “strengthen democracy for all voters by promoting the responsible use of technology in elections.” Verified Voting works with election officials, elected leaders, and other policymakers who are responsible for managing local and state election systems to mitigate the risks associated with novel voting technologies.

History

Foundation 
David L. Dill's research involves "circuit verification and synthesis and in verification methods for hard real-time systems". Part of this work has required him to testify on "electronic voting before the U.S. Senate and the Commission on Federal Election Reform". These interests ultimately led him to establishing the Verified Voting Foundation in 2003.

Activities

Partnerships and lobbying efforts 
Verified Voting partners with an array of organizations and coalitions to help coordinate post-election audits, tabletop exercises, and election protection work on a state and local level. The organization works closely with the Brennan Center for Justice and Common Cause; in 2020 the organizations advocated together for election best practices, such as paper ballots and adequate election security funding, in key swing states. Verified Voting also co-chaired the Election Protection Election Security Working Group during the 2020 election cycle, helping to monitor and respond to state-specific election security issues.

Verified Voting participates in several coalitions, including the Secure Our Vote Coalition and the National Task Force on Election Crises. Secure Our Vote helped to successfully block legislation permitting internet voting in Puerto Rico (see below for Verified Voting’s stance on internet voting). Verified Voting’s work with the National Task Force on Election Crises supported the Task Force’s mission to develop responses to potential election crises in 2020 and guarantee a peaceful transfer of power. 

Verified Voting also coordinates with its partners to advocate both federal and state governments for election security. The Foundation conducts this lobbying work as part of its 501(c)4 arm. At the federal level, the organization meets with lawmakers, sends letters, and issues statements to support “federal election security provisions that provide states and local jurisdictions with the funding and assistance they need to implement best practices like paper ballots and RLAs.” The organization also advocates in specific states, employing a “targeted approach” that seeks to address the specific election security and voter integrity issues facing a particular state. In 2020, for instance, the organization worked in Virginia to increase safe voting options amidst the pandemic, successfully advocated against internet voting legislation in New Jersey, and provided advice on RLA regulation to officials in California and Oregon.

The Verifier Tool 
Since 2004, Verified Voting has been collecting data on the nation’s voting machines and making it available through a web-based interactive tool called “the Verifier.” The Verifier is the most comprehensive publicly available set of data related to voting equipment usage in the United States. For each federal election cycle, the Verifier documents the specific voting equipment in use in every jurisdiction across the country. The Verifier is used by election officials, academics, organizations, the news-media, and general public as a source of information about voting technology. Since its inception, the Verifier has supported a number of initiatives including national election protection operations, state advocacy, policy making, reporting, and congressional research inquiries. To maintain the database, Verified Voting liaises with election officials, monitors local news stories, and researches certification documents. The Verifier is a critical aspect of Verified Voting's organizational infrastructure and supports the responsible use of technology in elections.

Stances

Stance on paper ballots 

Verified Voting advocates for the use of voter-verified paper ballots that “create tangible and auditable records of votes cast in an election.” Paper trails generated by voter-verified paper ballots “provide a reliable way to check that the computers were not compromised (whether through human error or malfeasance),” an important point given that 99% of all ballots cast in the United States are counted by a computer. Verified Voting advises state and local jurisdictions to help them “implement best practices for election security.” The organization advocates that election officials avoid using electronic voting systems which do not provide a paper trail.

Verified Voting plays a leading role in providing states and localities with the information, expertise, and advice needed to make informed decisions about the voting equipment they use and purchase. In 2019 and 2020, the organization offered feedback on the adoption of new voting machines in California, New York, Florida, North Carolina, Pennsylvania, as well as other states, advocating in all instances for the use of voter-verified paper ballots.

In 2022, legislators in at least six states and local jurisdictions have proposed to prohibit the use of ballot tabulating machines. The proposals stem from unproven theories that election machines around the country were hacked and votes were changed. Verified Voting, which advocates for election security measures, indicated that current hand counting of ballots is rare, and is used mostly in situations where there are few ballots to count.

Stance on internet voting 

Verified Voting works diligently to highlight risks of online voting and recommends that state and local governments avoid adopting these technologies. The organization argues that elections held online would be “easy targets for attackers.” Online voting, which includes voting on a mobile app, lacks the capacity to generate a voter-verified paper record and cannot protect a voter’s privacy or the integrity of their ballot. Verified Voting notes that unlike other online services, election manipulation is difficult to catch because ballot secrecy prevents voters from seeing their ballots after they have submitted them, which also prevents voters from determining if their votes have been digitally altered or not. A 2016 report co-authored by the organization concluded that “as states permit the marking and transmitting of marked ballots over the Internet, the right to a secret ballot is eroded and the integrity of our elections is put at risk.”

The organization notes that with mobile voting, there is no way to determine the security of “the actual device that voters cast their votes on...The voter’s device may already be corrupted with malware or viruses that could interfere with ballot transmission or even spread that malware to the computer at the elections office on the receiving end of the online ballot.” Online technologies that rely on blockchain technology faces a similar challenge: Verified Voting argues that while “blockchain technology is designed to keep information secure once it is received,” such technology “cannot defend against the multitude of threats to that information before it is entered in the blockchain.” Moreover, blockchain technology prevents voters from anonymously verifying their ballot, and presents risks to “ballot secrecy if encryption keys are not properly protected or software errors allow decryption of individual ballots.”

Post-election audits and risk-limiting audits 
Verified Voting advises state and local governments to pilot and implement and post-election audits and risk-limiting audits (RLAs). Post-election tabulation audits routinely check voting system performance. These audits are designed to check the accuracy of a certain tabulation--not the general results of an election. Risk-limiting audits, meanwhile “provide reason to trust that the final outcome matches the ballots.” RLAs accomplish this by checking a “random sample of voter-verifiable paper ballots, seeking evidence that the reported election outcome was correct, if it was.”  In this context, the 'correct' outcome is what a full hand count of the ballots would reveal. Since RLAs continue checking random samples until there is convincing evidence that the outcome is correct, “contests with wide margins can be audited with very few ballots, freeing up resources for auditing closer contests, which generally require checking more ballots.” RLAs can also trigger full hand recounts if the audit results do not support the reported election outcome. In order to facilitate the implementation of RLAs, Verified Voting designs pilot audits and post-election audits in conjunction with specific state and local governments, and has conducted studies in Rhode Island, Orange County (CA), and Fairfax (VA). These studies have helped lead to the implementation of RLAs and audit legislation in several states. The organization advocates for robust, post-election audits and also maintains an online, publicly-accessible database of all state election audit laws.

References 

501(c)(3) organizations
Election and voting-related organizations based in the United States